Marlesford railway station was a station located in Marlesford, Suffolk. It closed in 1952.

The station was served by trains that operated between Framlingham and Wickham Market until withdrawal of passenger services in November 1952.

As of 2020, the station building still exists and is clearly visible from the A12.

References

External links
 Marlesford station on navigable 1946 O. S. map
 Marlesford station in 1975
 Marlesford station in 1985

Disused railway stations in Suffolk
Former Great Eastern Railway stations
Railway stations in Great Britain opened in 1859
Railway stations in Great Britain closed in 1952